Speeton is a village in the civil parish of Reighton, in North Yorkshire, England. It lies near the edge of the coastal cliffs midway between Filey and Bridlington. It is North Yorkshire's easternmost settlement, but historically lay in the East Riding of Yorkshire until local government re-organisation in 1974.

Speeton railway station on the Yorkshire Coast Line from Hull to Scarborough served the village until it closed on 5 January 1970.

A local geological feature, the Speeton Clay Formation (approximately 130 million years old), was the source of an especially interesting fossil of a hermit crab.

Second World War

The Second World War defences constructed around Speeton have been documented by William Foot. They included a large number of pillboxes. Many of the remaining defences have been subject to coastal erosion.

St Leonard's Church

The church of St Leonard's at Speeton is one of the smallest parish churches in Yorkshire and was erected in the early Norman period, probably on the site of an earlier Saxon church. The church was Grade II* listed in June 1966.

References

External links

Villages in North Yorkshire